"La Peur" is an 1882 short story by Guy de Maupassant. It was first published in the October 23, 1882 issue of Le Gaulois, and later included in Contes de la bécasse in 1887. The short plot concerns the relation of incidents of fear told on the deck of a boat bound for Africa.

Maupassant also wrote a second similar story also called La Peur in 1884 for the Figaro, set on a train.

External links
 
 
 Fear by Guy de Maupassant

1882 short stories
Short stories by Guy de Maupassant